Qalandar Khan Lodhi (born 19 March 1944) is a Pakistani politician hailing from Abbottabad District who served as Minister for Food in the 10th Khyber Pakhtunkhwa Assembly.

Political career 
He is also served as two times member of Khyber Pakhtunkhwa Assembly from 2002 to 2008 and 2008–2013 as independent and later join Pakistan Muslim League (Q), again in 2013 election elected as independent and later join Pakistan Tehreek-e-Insaf. 

He was elected to PK-38 Abbottabad seat in 2018 General Election on the ticket of Pakistan Tehreek-e-Insaf. He is advisor to Chief Minister on  food since 2 June 2021.

External links

References

1944 births
Living people
People from Abbottabad District
Pakistan Tehreek-e-Insaf MPAs (Khyber Pakhtunkhwa)
Khyber Pakhtunkhwa MPAs 2013–2018